Carl von Gerber (23 August 1931 – 8 September 2013) was a Swedish sprint canoer. He competed at the 1960 and 1964 Olympics with the best result of fifth in the K-4 1000 m event in 1964. He won a bronze medal in the K-1 4 x 500 m event at the 1958 ICF Canoe Sprint World Championships in Prague.

References

Carl von Gerber's profile at Sports Reference.com
Carl von Gerber's profile at the Swedish Olympic Committee 

1931 births
2013 deaths
Canoeists at the 1960 Summer Olympics
Canoeists at the 1964 Summer Olympics
Olympic canoeists of Sweden
Swedish male canoeists
People from Västervik Municipality
Sportspeople from Kalmar County